The 2011 USL Pro season was the 25th season of third-division soccer in the United States, and was the inaugural season of the United Soccer Leagues' (USL) new professional competition. The league is effectively a combination of the USL's former First and Second Divisions.

Following the conclusion of the regular season in August, a postseason tournament, known as the USL Pro Playoffs, took place between the top eight clubs during the season. The quarterfinals was played between August 19–20, the semifinals between August 26–28, and the championship took place on September 3.

Teams
USL Pro was initially set to feature 15 clubs that would be aligned into three conferences of five clubs: the "American", "National" and "International" conferences. The league announced that each club would play an unbalanced schedule with a total of 24 matches. Initially, the International Division clubs were intended to play each other four times, twice home and twice away, with four games apiece at home and away against competition from the American and National Divisions. The American and National Division clubs were intended to play each other twice: home and away, regardless of division.

However, on May 10, 2011, the USL formally removed the three Puerto Rico Soccer League teams and announced that all remaining teams would continue to play a 24-game schedule.

Stadiums and Locations

Personnel and Kits

Note: Flags indicate national team as has been defined under FIFA eligibility rules. Players and Managers may hold more than one non-FIFA nationality.

Standings

American Division

National Division

Results table

†Puerto Rican teams were removed from USL Pro League on 10 May. All results against them that took place to that date were kept and future games were rescheduled amongst the remaining teams.

Playoffs
The top four teams in each division at the end of the regular season qualified for a single-elimination playoff for the USL Pro Championship. The championship match was played at 7:00 pm on Saturday, September 3, and saw Orlando City SC defeat the Harrisburg City Islanders in a penalty shootout. Orlando City SC earned the right to host the championship match by virtue of their better regular-season record.

Championship Game MVP: Sean Kelley (ORL)

Statistical leaders

Top scorers

Source:

Top assists

Source:

|}

Top Goalkeepers
(Minimum of 1080 Minutes Played)

Source:

League awards

 Most Valuable Player:  Yordany Álvarez (ORL)
 Rookie of the Year: Luke Mulholland (WIL)
 Defender of the Year:  Rob Valentino (ORL)
 Goalkeeper of the Year: Miguel Gallardo (ORL)
 Coach of the Year: Adrian Heath (ORL)

All-League Teams

First Team
F: Jhonny Arteaga (NEW), Matthew Delicâte (CHB), Maxwell Griffin (ORL)
M: Yordany Álvarez (ORL), Jorge Herrera (CHE), Luke Mulholland (WIL)
D: Nelson Akwari (LAB), Gareth Evans (WIL),  Rob Valentino (ORL), William Yomby (RIC)
G: Miguel Gallardo (ORL)

Second Team
F: José Angulo (HAR), George Davis IV (DAY), Jason Yeisley (PIT)
M: Lewis Neal (ORL), Lawson Robinson (ANT), Jamie Watson (ORL)
D: George Dublin (ANT), Colin Falvey (CHB),  Kyle Hoffer (NEW), Troy Roberts (ROC)
G: Neal Kitson (ROC)

References

 
2011
3
USL
2010–11 in Antigua and Barbuda football
2011–12 in Antigua and Barbuda football